A list of films produced by the Israeli film industry in 1966.

1966 releases

See also
1966 in Israel

References

External links
 Israeli films of 1966 at the Internet Movie Database

Israeli
Film
1966